During the 1946–47 Australian cricket season, all rounder Keith Miller represented Victoria and Australia. A 27-year-old right-handed batsman and fast bowler, Miller played in all five Tests against England, performing well with both bat and ball. He finished top of the Australian Test bowling averages, taking 16 wickets at 20.88, and was second in the batting averages, scoring 384 runs at 76.80. On his Ashes debut in the First Test in Brisbane, Miller scored 79 before taking match bowling figures of 9 wickets for 77 runs (9/77) in Australia's innings victory. In the Fourth Test, played at the Adelaide Oval, Miller broke through for his first Test century, scoring an unbeaten 141. A middle-order batsman and right-arm opening bowler, Miller finished the Test series as Australia's joint leading wicket-taker, along with his new ball partner Ray Lindwall, as Australia won the series 3–0.

Miller also played a key role in Victoria's Sheffield Shield triumph, scoring 667 runs for the State in four matches, all of which were won, at an average of 133.40. Miller scored 188 against South Australia, before making 153 and 206 not out, both at high tempo as Victoria twice defeated arch-rivals New South Wales.

Off the field, Miller was dogged by speculation as to whether he would honour a contract he had signed with Rawtenstall Cricket Club in the English Lancashire League, which would have ended his Test career. Miller resolved that he would remain in Australia, and accepted a job offer in New South Wales, but kept his decision private.

Background
Miller had made his first-class debut for Victoria before World War II as a specialist batsman not known for aggressive play. After the outbreak of war, Miller was deployed to England as a Royal Australian Air Force fighter pilot, flying in combat missions. While playing for military teams, he began to bowl more often, and was selected for Australian Services cricket team, a military outfit, to play in the Victory Tests against a full-strength England. During this series, Miller gained prominence with a series of hard-hitting displays and some rapid fast bowling against established Test batsmen such as Len Hutton. Miller topped the batting averages and took ten wickets and was hailed for his attacking play. He went on to make his Test debut in March 1946 in a one-off match against New Zealand, but this fixture was not given Test status until 1948. The 1946–47 Test series against the touring Englishmen would be his first Ashes one, and Miller was expected to play a prominent role with both bat and ball, especially in countering the visitors' powerful batting.

Early season

During the southern hemisphere winter of 1946, Miller had travelled to Boston, Massachusetts to marry Peg Wagner, whom he met during a stopover early in 1943 on the way to military service in the United Kingdom. After the wedding, the couple travelled back to Melbourne to start their married life.

Miller had only been back in Australia for a week when he faced Wally Hammond's visiting English team in the touring side's match against Victoria. His fielding and batting were rusty after the long layoff, and the media constantly probed him about the contract he had signed with Rawtenstall Cricket Club in the Lancashire League a few months earlier, to start in 1947. Miller said nothing in the press, but the Victorian Cricket Association made public appeals for an employer to give Miller a job so that he would not leave the state and become a professional sportsman in England. In the match against Hammond's men, Miller struggled while scoring 32 in the first innings before being dismissed by leg spinner Doug Wright. In the Victorian second innings he was bowled by James Langridge for eight.   Victorian captain Lindsay Hassett was not willing to ask Miller to bowl, given his lack of thorough preparation for the season; the tourists won the match by 244 runs.

Miller was selected for an Australian XI—a team comprising a mix of established international representatives and fringe players—fixture against the tourists prior to the Test series, but made only five runs with the bat and bowled only four overs, taking 0/8 in a rain-affected match that did not reach the second innings. In a Shield match against South Australia—led by national captain Don Bradman—at the Adelaide Oval, Miller had a chance to push for selection by performing well in front of the Australian captain, who was also a member of the three-man national selection panel.

Miller took 2/32 in 11 overs, bowling both of his victims as the hosts were dismissed for 270 on the first day. The Victorian paceman also had a chance to bowl at Bradman—who made a hundred—for a period. On the second day, Miller came to the crease at 2/171 to join Ken Meuleman after the openers had laid the platform with an opening stand of 158 runs. The pair added 26 runs before Meuleman fell at 3/197 and was replaced by Hassett. The pair batted until the end of the day as Victoria reached 3/285 at stumps to take first innings points, with Miller on 56 and Hassett 43. The next day, they continued to 188 and 114 respectively, their 224-run partnership ending when Phil Ridings bowled Hassett. This precipitated a collapse of 7/39 as Victoria finished at 548. Amid the visitors' faltering innings, it had taken a run out to remove Miller.

Miller used a wide array of strokes, leading The Advertiser of Adelaide to describe his innings as "dashing and colourful". Wisden said Miller's innings was "one of the finest batting displays ever seen at Adelaide". Due to the presence of Bradman, who was known for his ruthless and calculated attitude, Miller suppressed his carefree nature and played in a conservative and measured way, hoping to impress his prospective captain. After his long innings, Hassett asked Miller to only bowl two overs in the second innings, and Victoria were left needing 79 runs in 35 minutes for victory after the hosts were dismissed for 356. With a series of fours and quick singles, Miller and Hassett guided the visitors to the target in just 63 balls, with five minutes to spare. Miller was dismissed for 33 in the final over, just before the Victorians completed the chase.

Bradman saw Miller as a top-order batsman and as his new ball partner for Lindwall, although the Victorian allrounder was a reluctant bowler. The Australian captain felt that Miller was crucial to his strategy of attacking England's strong batting line-up—which boasted the likes of Hammond, Denis Compton, Len Hutton, Bill Edrich and Cyril Washbrook—with high pace. Miller was duly selected for the Australian team for the First Test.

First Test
Miller made his Ashes debut in the First Test in Brisbane the day after his 27th birthday. Miller was slated to bat at No. 5 and Bradman fielded six front-line bowlers, but this did not weaken the batting, as four of the bowlers, Miller, Lindwall, Colin McCool and Ian Johnson, had all scored centuries in first-class cricket. Australia batted first but Miller was not needed until day two, coming in to join Hassett after Bradman was dismissed for 187 with the score at 3/322. Miller was asleep when Bradman fell, but roused himself and played aggressively to reach his half-century in just 80 minutes before lunch. He struck one six onto the roof of the members' stand at long-on, the biggest hit at the ground at the time. Miller's 106-run partnership with Hassett ended when Alec Bedser removed the latter caught at mid-on, having already been dropped four times. After the lunch break, Miller slowed down and was eventually trapped leg before wicket (lbw) by leg spinner Doug Wright, ending his first Ashes innings at 79, having taken 80 minutes to score his last 29 runs. During the course of his innings, which Australian cricket writer Johnnie Moyes described as "attractive and stately", Miller passed 3,000 runs at first-class level. Australia reached 645 on the third day, a national record against England at home, before a tropical storm hit, complete with hailstones as large as golf balls. The tourists were very unaccustomed to such weather and were extremely disturbed by the noisy downpour. Miller was given the new ball along with Lindwall and he took his first Ashes wicket, bowling Hutton after testing him with a series of bouncers as England closed at 1/21.

During that first Test, an incident occurred, coloured by Miller's wartime service, that soured his relationship with Bradman and his feelings towards Test cricket. Michael Parkinson described it as follows:
Keith Miller was deeply affected by the Second World War. It changed him ... In the first post-war Ashes Test ... England were caught on a sticky ... [and] Bill Edrich came in. He'd had a serious war and he survived and Miller thought, 'He's my old Services mate. The last thing he wants after five years' war is to be flattened by a cricket ball, so I eased up. Bradman came up to me and said, 'Don't slow down, Keith. Bowl quicker.' That remark put me off Test cricket. Never felt the same way about it after that.'

The following day, the pitch dried out under the hot sun and turned into a sticky wicket. Miller bowled at a mixture of pace and off breaks and added a large amount of bouncers, leading former Australian Test batsmen and journalist Jack Fingleton to compare the amount of high-paced short-pitched bowling by the Australian pair to that during Bodyline. On the uneven surface, Edrich was struck around 40 times on the body. Miller cut down the English top-order, removing Washbrook, Compton, Edrich and Jack Ikin on the fourth morning to leave England at 5/56. After removing Washbrook, caught by Sid Barnes with only four more runs added to the overnight total, Miller trapped Compton lbw for 17, leaving England at 3/49. After having Edrich caught in the slips by Colin McCool, Miller removed Ikin first-ball, caught behind by wicket-keeper Don Tallon to be on a hat-trick, but Norman Yardley prevented him from taking a third wicket in as many balls. After Hammond and Yardley stabilised the innings with a 61-run partnership, Miller later returned to remove wicket-keeper Paul Gibb and his replacement Bedser in consecutive balls, but last man Wright successfully thwarted Miller's second hat-trick attempt. The Victorian paceman finished with 7/60, his first five-wicket haul at first-class level.

England made 141 and Bradman forced them to follow on. Miller removed Hutton again, this time caught by Sid Barnes from the first ball of the innings. He combined with Barnes 45 minutes later to remove Hutton's opening partner Washbrook to leave England at 3/33. The pitch, still rain-affected, hastened England's defeat by an innings and 332 runs within 44 overs. Miller finished with 2/17 from 11 overs in the second innings to end with match figures of 9/77. England had fallen to their heaviest Test defeat on Australian soil, losing 15 wickets in the space of 210 minutes on the fifth day. Miller's highly productive Ashes debut led to further speculation as to whether he was willing to end his Test career to turn professional in England. Miller continued to ignore Rawtenstall's requests for confirmation and refused to comment on the issue to the media, hoping that he would get a better job offer in Australia in the meantime.

Second Test
A fortnight later, Miller proceeded to the Second Test in Sydney, where he had a quiet match without his partner Lindwall, who was sidelined with chickenpox. England batted first and Miller opened the bowling with Victorian teammate and debutant Fred Freer. Miller bowled nine overs without success, conceding 24 runs as Hammond's tourists amassed 270. On a turning surface, nine of the English wickets fell to the spinners Johnson and McCool. In the hosts' reply, Miller contributed 40 with seven fours in a 63-run stand with Barnes as Australia reached 4/159. Bradman—who had dropped himself down the order—and Barnes then both scored 234 and put together a world record fifth-wicket partnership of 405 to propel Australia to 8/659 declared. Miller bowled 11 overs in the second innings, taking the wicket of Hutton who was out hit wicket after going on a short-lived attack that yielded 37 runs from 39 balls in 24 minutes. Hutton shaped to drive the last ball before lunch, and successfully made contact, but in following through, his bat slipped from his hand and clipped the stumps. Miller had a light bowling workload as Johnson and McCool took seven wickets between them for the innings and eight wickets each for the match as Australia completed another innings victory.

Miller saved his best batting for the Shield clash with arch-rivals New South Wales, which started on Boxing Day at the Melbourne Cricket Ground (MCG). The visitors batted first and made 205, Miller taking 2/22 from ten overs. He then came to the crease on the first afternoon with Victoria at 1/31 after Meuleman was dismissed. Miller hammered three sixes from one over against Test teammate Ernie Toshack, having started the over on three runs. After measuring up Toshack's bowling for the first two balls, Miller hooked the third ball over fine leg for six. He then lifted the sixth ball over square leg, was dropped by the bowler on the seventh ball, before driving the last ball into the crowd at long on. Miller reached his fifty in 41 minutes and was 79 at the close of play, with Victoria on 1/154. The next day, he fell for 153, ending a 271-run partnership with Merv Harvey that took just over three hours. It took another run out to terminate Miller's innings at 2/302. Miller's childhood hero Bill Ponsford said that Miller's display was the hardest hitting he had ever seen. The Sun-Pictorial opined that "the M.C.G. seemed to shrink in size. It was reported that each time Keith shaped to Toshack the crowd in the boundary seats ducked." Victoria declared at 8/560, Test teammates Lindwall and Toshack taking the most punishment with figures of 1/100 and 0/133 from 18 and 21 overs respectively. Miller then took 1/41—his 50th first-class wicket—and a catch as Victoria won by an innings and 114 runs.

Third Test
The Third Test was Miller's first in his home town, and he produced a quiet performance in a drawn match. He scored 33 before being caught behind by Godfrey Evans from the bowling of Wright as Australia stumbled and lost three wickets in four runs to be 6/192; the hosts recovered to reach 365 in the first innings. Miller then bowled ten wicketless overs for 34 and caught Ikin from the leg spin of Bruce Dooland in England's reply of 351. Miller then scored 34 as Australia set England 551 to win in seven hours. Miller then took 2/41 in the second innings, removing Ikin and Bedser during a spell in tandem with Lindwall late on the final day that was punctuated by frequent bouncers. Miller also ran out Compton, but England held on for a draw with three wickets intact.

Miller then played for Tasmania Combined XI—which consisted mainly of Victorians—against Hammond's tourists in Hobart. He scored 70 and 30, opening in the second innings, and took a wicket in each innings, removing Evans and Ikin as the match ended in a draw. This was followed by a match against Queensland in Brisbane in which Miller scored 81 batting at No. 3, featuring in a 93-run stand with Meuleman as Victoria amassed 466. He then took 3/21 in the hosts' first innings, removing opener Geoff Cook before returning late in the innings to take two of the last three wickets. Hassett asked the Queenslanders to follow on and Miller took 1/20 and two catches as the hosts were defeated by an innings and 13 runs. Miller had a light workload with the ball as Hassett asked him to deliver only 15.4 eight-ball overs.

Miller made another famous century in the return Sheffield Shield match against arch-rivals New South Wales at the Sydney Cricket Ground. Miller had a lean time with the bat in the first innings, being dismissed for six as Hassett's tourists made 356. He was then punished as the New South Welshmen amassed 79 runs from his 14 overs, taking only the wicket of Ginty Lush as the hosts replied with 329. Miller came to the crease at 2/118 after 100 minutes on the third morning, with brothers Merv and Neil Harvey back in the pavilion. Miller combined with Ian Johnson (82) in a 126-run partnership, before sharing an unbroken 206-run stand with Meuleman. By stumps, 232 minutes after he came to the crease, Miller had reached 206 not out, and Victoria declared at 3/450. Miller struck 15 fours and three sixes in a strident attack on the bowling. His first six was struck from the leg spin of Fred Johnston and landed on the roof of the Members Stand. The second, from the occasional left arm unorthodox spin of Test teammate Arthur Morris, was a lofted drive that went straight back over the bowler's head and over the sightscreen at the Paddington End; the ball was still rising when it hit the upper deck of the MA Noble Stand around 100 m away. His third six sent a delivery from Test bowling colleague Toshack over the square leg fence.

At one stage, Toshack had a long-on, long-off and a man directly behind the bowler to stop Miller's powerful drives. One such shot from the bowling of Morris was hit with such power that it rebounded from the sightscreen almost to the bowler. Lindwall, the fastest bowler in the world, was delivering to Miller at one stage  with a solitary slip and nine men in the outfield. After his long innings, Miller was only required to bowl two wicketless overs for six runs as New South Wales were bowled out for 189 and suffered a 288-run loss. These two decisive victories played a large part in Victoria's winning of the Sheffield Shield.

Miller's uncertain future continued to dog him, and Rawtenstall expressed their displeasure at their recruit's apparent refusal to fulfil his contract. Miller had privately decided that he would not go through with the deal, but was refusing to inform the Lancastrian club. In the meantime, he had various job proposals, which he spurned until privately receiving a contract offer from the manager of North Sydney Cricket Club. The proposed deal would give him a subsidy for the costs of his relocation to Sydney to work as a liquor salesman, and gave him generous leave conditions so that he could play sport.

Fourth Test
Having resolved the issue of his playing future, Miller was back in a good frame of mind for the Fourth Test in Adelaide. In a high-scoring match, Miller took a wicket in each innings, but he shone with the bat. England batted first and had reached a strong position of 4/320 on the second day when Miller bowled Joe Hardstaff junior, who edged a bouncer into his stumps for 67, ending a partnership of 118 with centurion Compton; the hosts lost wickets steadily thereafter to be dismissed for 460, and Miller ended with 1/45 from 16 overs in extreme heat. After Morris and Hassett put on 179 runs for the third wicket, Miller came in at 3/207 late on the third day and reached 33 by the time stumps were drawn with Australia at 4/293, while his partner Johnson was unbeaten on 35.

On the first ball of the third morning, Miller hooked the ball into the crowd, landing just in front of the governor's VIP box to move to 39. He quickly accumulated another 61 runs in 71 minutes to reach his maiden Test century. Miller and Johnson added a further 79 runs in the morning, of which the latter contributed only 17 before being dismissed for 52, such was Miller's rate of scoring. Miller did not play more expansively after reaching triple figures, as three wickets fell at the other end for 24 runs and the Englishmen, particularly Yardley, utilised leg theory to stifle the scoring. As the English bowlers continued to regularly take tail-end wickets, Miller accelerated again, launching drives into the crowd as England stationed four men on the fence waiting in vain to catch one of his lofted strokes. Miller ended unbeaten on 141 from 198 balls as Australia took a first innings lead, but the match petered into a high-scoring draw. In the second innings, Miller and Lindwall unsuccessfully tried to attack Hutton and Washbrook with bouncers as the English openers registered a century partnership. Miller took Bedser's wicket to end with 1/34 from 11 overs as England reached 8/340 before declaring. Miller was not required to bat after Australia were set 314 runs to win in 195 minutes; they reached 1/215 when time ran out.

Before the last Test, Miller played for Victoria against England in his final match for his native state before moving to New South Wales. He scored six before being stumped from the medium pace of Bedser and took 4/63 in the first innings, his best bowling since the First Test, as England scored 355 before Victoria replied with 327. His victims included Gibb, Yardley and Compton for 93, thereby preventing the English batsman from scoring his fifth century in as many innings. The match ended in a draw when England were bowled out for 118 in their second innings; Miller bowled two overs in his final actions for Victoria, conceding two runs without taking a wicket.

Fifth Test
The Fifth Test saw Miller take a wicket in each innings, his victims being Wright and Evans. He also caught Yardley and Compton in the first and second innings respectively. After Miller scored 23 to help Australia make 253 in reply to England's 280, the tourists fell for 186 in their second innings, leaving the hosts with a target of 214 runs on a wearing wicket that was increasingly aiding spin. Miller came to the crease when Bradman fell with the score at 3/149. McCool joined Miller after the loss of Hassett and Ron Hamence in quick succession left Australia at 5/180. Wright then beat Miller with three consecutive leg breaks, before the batsman struck back against Bedser with consecutive boundaries for four. Together with McCool, Miller saw Australia to the target without further loss.

Australia had taken the series 3–0, Miller scoring 384 runs at 76.80 and taking 16 wickets at 20.88, which placed him second in both batting and bowling averages behind Bradman and Lindwall respectively. Nevertheless, Miller did not enjoy himself as much as during the Victory Tests of 1945 and became disillusioned with Bradman's relentless pursuit of victory and ruthless mentality. Miller was impulsive and cared little for records or mercilessly dominating his opponents; he loved to play in a flamboyant manner with early declarations to keep the match alive and less concern for winning or losing. Hassett had outlined after the Victory Tests that the post-war era should be about "cricket, not war". Miller's Services teammate and biographer Richard Whitington said that Miller "did not enjoy the humiliation of men who had proved themselves champions before the war".

However, Test cricket had always been fought fiercely, and the ruthless Bradman was not about to change this. The Australian skipper repeatedly shut England out of the game with massive totals, relentlessly snuffing out any prospects of an opposition win rather than maximising the chances of an Australian victory with enterprising declarations. On reflection, Miller said "It was inevitable that The Don and I should have clashed. Our temperaments are so different."

Overall, Miller played in 13 first-class matches during the Australian summer, scoring 1,202 runs at 75.12 and taking 32 wickets at 22.65. In matches for Victoria, where he played under Hassett's captaincy, Miller scored 713 runs at 89.13 and took 14 wickets at 21.14. In all, he took 14 catches. Of the six matches in the victorious Sheffield Shield campaign, five were won and the other was drawn, Miller averaging 133.40.

Playing role

As England had a strong batting lineup, Bradman wanted a large range of specialist bowlers in the Tests, and this was made possible as his preferred bowlers were skillful with the bat. Australia's bowling line-up consisted of Miller, McCool (leg spin), Johnson (off spin), Lindwall, George Tribe (both left arm orthodox and unorthodox) and Toshack. The only deviations were Lindwall missing one Test due to chickenpox, and leg spinner Dooland replacing left-arm spinner Tribe in two Tests.

Of the First Test team, all bar Toshack scored multiple first-class centuries in their careers, and all averaged under 27.50 with the ball. As Bradman wanted all four spin techniques covered, as well as both left and right-arm seamers, this also meant that he could only have two fast bowlers—Lindwall and Miller—as three positions were occupied by spinners and a fourth by Toshack, who was of medium pace.

While Miller was a reluctant bowler, Bradman used him heavily because of his desire to have every possible spin option. Miller thus played as a middle-order batsman batting at No. 5 ahead of the wicket-keeper and the other bowlers, and an opening fast bowler, partnering Lindwall. For Victoria, Miller often batted higher at No. 3 or No. 4 and bowled less. For his state, Miller averaged more with the bat, which he felt was because he was able to concentrate more on his batting, as Hassett gave him a smaller workload with the ball.

References

Footnotes

Bibliography

 

Keith Miller